Isaiah Eisendorf (אייזאה אייזנדורף; born July 9, 1996) is an American-Israeli basketball player who last played for Hapoel Galil Elyon of the Israeli Premier League. He plays the forward position. He most recently competed in the Israeli Basketball Premier League for Bnei Herzliya Basket.

Early life

Eisendorf is from Los Angeles, California, and is Jewish. He is 6' 6" (198 cm) tall, and weighs 220 pounds (100 kg). He is the stepson of  sportswriter Norman Chad.

He played high school basketball for Springbrook High School ('14) in Silver Spring, Maryland. As a senior Eisendorf was named all-county second-team and All-Met honorable-mention, as well as a Montgomery County All-Star. He also played high school football, as a wide receiver and defensive end.

College
Eisendorf attended Gannon University. He first played college basketball for the Gannon Golden Knights in 2014–16.

He then transferred and played college basketball at Le Moyne College ('18) for the Le Moyne Dolphins from 2016–18. In 2018 Eisendorf was Northeast-10 Conference All-Tournament Team, Northeast-10 Tournament MVP, Northeast-10 All-Conference Second Team, and National Association of Basketball Coaches All-District East Second Team.

Professional career
Eisendorf played in the Israeli Basketball Premier League for Hapoel Tel Aviv in 2019–20, and also played in the league for Bnei Herzliya Basket since 2020.

On April 11, 2021, he was loaned to Hapoel Galil Elyon. On July 16, 2021 he signed a contract and become a permanent player for Hapoel Galil Elyon.

References 

1996 births
Living people
American men's basketball players
Basketball players from Los Angeles
Gannon Golden Knights men's basketball players
Hapoel Galil Elyon players
Israeli American
Israeli men's basketball players
Jewish men's basketball players
Le Moyne Dolphins men's basketball players